In December 2013, the USWNT All-Time Best XI was named by the United States Soccer Federation. A committee of 56 former soccer players and administrators, as well as media members, voted for the team. 11 United States women's national soccer team players were chosen, with results leaning heavily toward the team that won the 1999 World Cup. Mia Hamm and Joy Fawcett were unanimously voted into the Best XI, while Alex Morgan, the team’s youngest player (24), was named on 15 ballots.

For the complete list of the players nominated, see USWNT All-Time Best XI.

Selected players

See also

 List of sports awards honoring women

References

External links
 
U.S. Soccer to Announce All-Time Best XI for Men’s and Women’s National Teams to Close Out Centennial Year from U.S. Soccer
Hamm, Wambach, Morgan lead U.S. Soccer’s all-time women’s best XI (but no Solo, Milbrett) from NBC Sports

All-Time Best XI
Women's association football trophies and awards
Lists of United States women's international soccer players
Association football player non-biographical articles